Thomas Vesey Dawson (3 September 1819 – 5 November 1854) was an Irish Whig politician and army officer.

He was the son of Richard Thomas Dawson, 2nd Baron Cremorne and Anne Elizabeth Emily née Whaley. In 1851, he married Augusta Frederic Annie FitzPatrick, daughter of John FitzPatrick, 1st Baron Castletown and Augusta Mary née Douglas. They had at least two children: Vesey John Dawson (1853–1930), and Douglas Dawson (1854–1933).

He remained MP for the latter seat until 1852, when he did not seek re-election.

He attained the rank of lieutenant-colonel in the Coldstream Guards, a role that led to his death at the Battle of Inkerman in 1854.

He was a member of the Guards' Club and Reform Club.

References

External links
 

UK MPs 1841–1847
Whig (British political party) MPs for Irish constituencies
1819 births
1854 deaths
Coldstream Guards officers
Thomas
British Army personnel of the Crimean War
British military personnel killed in the Crimean War